KXBL (99.5 FM) is a classic country radio station known as "Big Country 99.5" ("Big Country" was a slogan 1170 KVOO now KTSB used during its country music heyday). Located in Henryetta, Oklahoma, it broadcasts to the Tulsa, Oklahoma area. The station is owned by Griffin Communications. Its studios are located in Downtown Tulsa and shares a transmitter with television station KTPX-TV in Mounds, Oklahoma.

KBXL broadcasts in the HD hybrid format.

History
In the 1970s & 1980's, the station was known as KGCG "The Green Country Giant" then later as KDLB "Double Barrel Country" (both as country stations). It later went dark, then came back on the air in 1985 as "Magic 99" (KQMJ) until 1991. After that, it became "99.5 The Storm" with calls KSTM. KSTM flipped to country in March 1993 and changed calls to KCKI as "Kick99". It changed calls in 2001 to KXBL and became "99.5 The Bull". In 2003, KXBL became a classic country station as "Big Country 99.5" its current format.

Journal Communications (KXBL's former owner) and the E. W. Scripps Company (owner of NBC's local affiliate KJRH-TV) announced on July 30, 2014 that the two companies would merge to create a new broadcast company under the E. W. Scripps Company name that will own the two companies' broadcast properties, including KXBL. The transaction was completed in 2015, with shareholder and regulatory approvals.

On June 26, 2018, parent company E. W. Scripps announced that it would sell KXBL - along with its sister stations, KBEZ, KFAQ, KHTT, and KVOO to Griffin Communications. Griffin began operating the stations under a local marketing agreement on July 30, and completed the purchase October 1; the company already owned CBS affiliate KOTV-DT and CW affiliate KQCW-DT.

KXBL originated a daily midday program with country music star and area native Joe Diffie, which aired until his death. The program was recorded from Nashville and from his tour stops.

References

External links

XBL
Classic country radio stations in the United States
Griffin Media